The 1909 East Denbighshire by-election was held on 2 April 1909.  The by-election was held due to the incumbent Liberal MP, Edward Hemmerde, becoming Recorder of Liverpool.  It was retained by Hemmerde.

References

1909 in Wales
1900s elections in Wales
History of Denbighshire
1909 elections in the United Kingdom
By-elections to the Parliament of the United Kingdom in Welsh constituencies